The Last Days of Winter (Persian: آخرین روزهای زمستان, romanized: Akharin Rouzhaye Zemestan) is an Iranian television documentary series directed and written by Mohammad Hossein Mahdavian, which aired on IRIB TV1 from 28 September to 6 December, 2012 for 10 episodes.

The series is about Hassan Bagheri, an Iranian commander in the Iran-Iraq war.

Plot 
The series centers on Martyr Hassan Bagheri, whose real name is Gholam Hossein Afshardi, one of the youngest commanders in Iran during the Iran-Iraq war, who was the deputy commander of the IRGC's ground forces at the time of his martyrdom.

Cast 
 Mahdi Zaminpardaz
 Soheil Babaei
 Ebrahim Amini
 Mojtaba Shafiei
 Saeed Mirzafar
 Gita Bahadori
 Hossein Dehghan Azad
 Hamed Pourmohammadi
 Maryam Moridi
 Mehrnoush Balmi
 Mohammad Mehdi Hosseini

References

External links 
 

Iran–Iraq War films
Iranian television series
Iranian documentary films
Iranian war films